The New England Collegiate Conference (NECC) is an NCAA Division III college athletic conference based in the Northeastern United States.

History

In June 2007, nine colleges from New England announced the creation of a new athletic conference under the same NECC name.

The conference, which began operations July 1, 2008, in Division III, currently includes Lesley University (Cambridge), Mitchell College (New London, Connecticut), Eastern Nazarene College (Quincy) and New England College (Henniker, New Hampshire) as members. Their indicated locations are in Massachusetts unless otherwise noted.
 
Southern Vermont and Newbury both announced they would cease operations after the 2018–19 academic year, and founding member Becker College announced the same after the 2020–21 school year. Elms College joined the Great Northeast Athletic Conference, where it had competed as a swimming and diving affiliate since 2008, in the 2021-22 academic year. In July 2021, original member Bay Path was admitted to the United States Collegiate Athletic Association (USCAA), implicitly leaving the conference and the NCAA.

Within the past year, there have been changes. Bard College joined the NECC for men's volleyball as an associate member beginning the spring of 2023. Lesley received and accepted an invitation to join the North Atlantic Conference (NEC), while Mitchell and New England College both accepted an invitation to the Great Northeast Athletic Conference (GNAC), all beginning the 2023-24 season. In 2023 it was announced that Eastern Nazarene College would also be joining the NAC. 

The NECC may remain in operation for men's volleyball and the non-NCAA sport of esports. The conference has nine men's volleyball members in the current 2023 season, and the NCAA's official membership database lists all nine NECC men's volleyball teams as being members of the "New England Volleyball Conference". Over 25 schools are affiliate members in esports.

Chronological timeline
 2007 - On May 31, 2007, The New England Collegiate Conference (NECC) was founded. Charter members included Bay Path College (now Bay Path University), Becker College, Daniel Webster College, Elms College, Lesley University, Mitchell College, Newbury College, Southern Vermont College and Wheelock College, effective beginning the 2008-09 academic year.
 2008 - Springfield College and Massachusetts Institute of Technology (MIT) joined the NECC as associate members for men's golf, effective in the 2008 fall season (2008-09 academic year).
 2009 - Massachusetts Tech (MIT) left the NECC as an associate member for men's golf as the school dropped the sport due to budget cuts, effective after the 2008-09 academic year.
 2009 - Babson College joined the NECC as an associate member for men's golf, effective in the 2009 fall season (2009-10 academic year).
 2011 - Regis College joined the NECC, effective in the 2011-12 academic year.
 2011 - Endicott College joined the NECC as an associate member for men's volleyball, effective in the 2012 spring season (2011-12 academic year).
 2016 - Eastern Nazarene College joined the NECC as an associate member for men's volleyball, effective in the 2017 spring season (2016-17 academic year).
 2017 - Two institutions left the NECC to join their respective new home primary conferences: Daniel Webster closed while Regis joined the Great Northeast Athletic Conference (GNAC), effective after the 2016-17 academic year.
 2017 - Dean College joined the NECC, effective in the 2018-19 academic year.
 2018 - Wheelock left the NECC as the school announced that it would be merged into Boston University, effective after the 2017-18 academic year.
 2018 - New England College join the NECC (with Eastern Nazarene upgrading for all sports), both effective in the 2018-19 academic year.
 2018 - Nichols College joined the NECC as an associate member for men's volleyball, effective in the 2019 spring season (2018-19 academic year).
 2019 - Newbury and Southern Vermont left the NECC as both schools announced that they would close, effective after the 2018-19 academic year.
 2019 - Springfield and Babson left the NECC as associate members for men's golf, effective after the 2018-19 academic year.
 2019 - Five institutions joined the NECC as associate members: Husson University, the University of Maine at Farmington, Manhattanville College and Thomas College for field hockey, and Northern Vermont University–Johnson for men's volleyball, all effective in the 2019-20 academic year.
 2020 - Dean left the NECC to join the GNAC, effective after the 2019-20 academic year.
 2020 - Russell Sage College joined the NECC as an associate member for men's volleyball, effective in the 2021 spring season (2020-21 academic year).
 2021 - Three institutions left the NECC to join their respective new home primary conferences: Becker closed, Bay Path would leave the NCAA to join the United States Collegiate Athletic Association (USCAA), and Elms joined the GNAC, all effective after the 2020-21 academic year; thus leaving the conference with four institutions to compete in the 2021-22 academic year.
 2021 - SUNY Poly and SUNY Potsdam joined the NECC as associate members for men's volleyball, effective in the 2022 spring season (2021-22 academic year).
 2022 - Manhattanville left the NECC as an associate member for field hockey to join the Atlantic East Conference, effective after the 2021 fall season (2021-22 academic year).
 2022 - Lesley will leave the NECC to join the North Atlantic Conference (NAC), while Mitchell and NEC will leave to join the Great Northeast Athletic Conference (GNAC), all effective after the 2022-23 academic year.
 2022 - Bard College joined the NECC as an associate member for men's volleyball, effective in the 2023 spring season (2022-23 academic year).
 2023 - Eastern Nazarene will leave the NECC to join the NAC.

Member schools

Current members
The NECC currently has four full members, all are private schools. Departing members are highlighted in pink.

Notes

Associate members
The NECC currently has ten associate members, six of them are private schools:

Notes

Esports associate members 
The NECC currently has 27 associate members for eSports, all but eight are private schools:

Notes

Former members
The NECC had nine former full members, all were private schools:

Notes

Former associate members
The NECC had four former associate members, all private schools.

Notes

Membership timeline

Sports

References

External links